Precious Chikwendu Fani-Kayode (born 25 May 1989) is a beauty pageant titleholder from Etti-Nanka, Anambra State. She is a model and a Nollywood actress.

Early life and education
Precious is the second child of a family of seven children. She had her primary education at Makurdi International School, Benue State. She attended ECWA Secondary School, North Bank Makurdi, Benue State for her secondary school.

She graduated from the University of Calabar, Cross River State, where she obtained a Bachelor of Science (BSc) degree in Environmental Science (Forestry and Wildlife Conservation).

Career

Precious started modelling in 2006, participating in ‘M IDOLS FASHION SHOW’ in Calabar. In the same year, she took part in numerous fashion and runway shows including NIGERIA TELEVISION FASHION SHOW, CATWALK FOR CHANGE and GALAXY TELEVISION FASHION WEEK.

In 2007, Precious emerged first runner-up in the Prettiest Girl Nigeria contest and also participated in the Miss Earth Nigeria Pageant, where she finished in the Top 10.

In 2010, she was a contestant in Miss Nigeria 2010, which was held in Abuja.

Precious has, most recently, been the face of brands and events like Face of Safari and Face of Genism. She has starred in numerous TV commercials, most notably Medik55 and Passions Energy Drink, both of Orange Drugs Pharmaceuticals.

She dabbled into acting in 2007. In addition to her acting career, before winning the world title, she worked at Star Advantage Company Calabar as a commercial manager.

Precious Chikwendu Fani-Kayode was voted online to represent Nigeria at Miss United Nations Pageants in Jamaica, she won the World title in June 2014.

She is the Founder and C.E.O of Glowria Snow Fashion House.

Personal life

Precious Chikwendu Fani-Kayode is married to Mr. Femi Fani-Kayode. They have a son and his name is Joshua Olufemi Emmanuel Lotanna Aragorn Fani-Kayode. On May 25, 2018, Precious Chikwendu Fani-Kayode was delivered of triplets (boys) at DIFF Hospital.

References

1989 births
Living people
Most Beautiful Girl in Nigeria contestants
Igbo beauty pageant contestants
Nigerian beauty pageant winners
People from Anambra State
University of Calabar alumni
Fani-Kayode family